Elections were held in the Australian state of Victoria on Saturday 31 May 1922 to elect 17 of the 34 members of the state's Legislative Council. This was the first Legislative Council election for which preferential voting was used.

Results

Legislative Council

|}

Retiring Members

Nationalist
William Adamson MLC (South Eastern)
William Baillieu MLC (Northern)

Candidates
Sitting members are shown in bold text. Successful candidates are highlighted in the relevant colour. Where there is possible confusion, an asterisk (*) is also used.

See also
1921 Victorian state election

References

1922 elections in Australia
Elections in Victoria (Australia)
Results of Victorian state elections
1920s in Victoria (Australia)
May 1922 events